Damian-Cristian Strătilă (born 28 July 1996) is a Romanian rugby union football player. He plays as a flanker for professional SuperLiga club Timișoara Saracens.

Personal life
Damian-Cristian is the younger brother of former Steaua teammate Sabin Strătilă.

International career
Strătilă is also selected for Romania's national team, the Oaks, making his international debut during the 3rd week of 2021 Autumn Nations Series in a test match against Los Teros on 7 November 2021.

References

External links

1996 births
Living people
People from Constanța
Romanian rugby union players
Romania international rugby union players
CSA Steaua București (rugby union) players
SCM Rugby Timișoara players
Rugby union flankers